Ind or IND may refer to:

General 
 Independent (politician), a politician not affiliated to any political party
 Independent station, used within television program listings and the television industry for a station that is not affiliated with any network
 Independent Subway System, a former rapid transit rail system in New York City that is now part of the New York City Subway
 International Nurses Day, celebrated in early May of each year to mark the contributions nurses make to society

Science and technology 
 Improvised nuclear device, theoretical illicit nuclear weapon
 IND, the Index control character in the C0 and C1 control codes
 Individualism Index, a measure of a person's independence from organizations or collectivity
 Induced representation, in mathematics, an operation for passing from a representation of a subgroup to a representation of the group itself
 Indus (constellation), a constellation in the southern sky
 Investigational New Drug, an experimental drug permitted by the U.S. FDA to be transported across the U.S. state lines

Organizations 
 Immigration and Nationality Directorate, a former part of the Home Office, a department of the United Kingdom government
 Immigration and Naturalisation Service (Netherlands), the organization that handles the admission of foreigners in the Netherlands
 Independent News Distributors, a defunct comics and magazine distributor
 Institute of Notre Dame, a high school in Baltimore, Maryland
 Interplanetary Network Directorate, a branch of the NASA Jet Propulsion Laboratory that manages the agency's Deep Space Network
 Iota Nu Delta, the first South Asian interest college fraternity

Locations and languages 
 India, a country in South Asia
 Indiana, a state in the United States of America (archaic: 2-letter abbreviation "IN" is now preferred to avoid confusion with India or Indianapolis)
 Indianapolis, a city in the U.S. state Indiana (also abbreviated as "Indy")
 Indianapolis (Amtrak station), a railway station located in the city
 Indianapolis International Airport, the IATA abbreviation code for an airport located in the city
 Scoreboard and/or statistics line abbreviation for sports franchises located in Indianapolis:
 Indiana Fever, the city's Women's National Basketball Association (WNBA) team
 Indiana Pacers, the city's National Basketball Association (NBA) team
 Indianapolis Colts, the city's National Football League (NFL) team
 Indianapolis Indians, the city's International League (IL) baseball team
 Indy Eleven, the city's United Soccer League (USL) team
 Indy Fuel, the city's ECHL hockey team
 Indonesian language, the official language of Indonesia